Wilfred Pierrepont "Bunny" Brimble (16 November 1913 – 18 September 1999) was a New Zealand rugby league footballer who played in the 1930s. He played for New Zealand.

Background
Brimble was one of seven brothers, who all shared middle name Pierrepont. Two of his other brothers, Edward (better known as Ted) and Walter, also represented New Zealand. Another older brother (Cyril) played rugby at Manukau and also represented Newton Rangers in Auckland rugby league. While their eldest brother John, played for Manukau rugby and spent many years on their committee.

Born in Hilo Hawaii, Brimble had an English father and a Bantu mother Jane Depua Mahdna. The family moved to Onehunga, New Zealand in 1914.

Playing career
Brimble played for the Newton Rangers club. Despite being of African origin, Brimble was selected for, and played for, the New Zealand Māori side.

Brimble toured Australia with the New Zealand national rugby league team in 1938, however the side played in no test matches.

References

1913 births
1999 deaths
Auckland rugby league team players
American emigrants to New Zealand
New Zealand national rugby league team players
New Zealand rugby league players
New Zealand Māori rugby league players
Manukau Magpies players